Talbehat is a nagar panchayat city in Lalitpur district in the Indian state of Uttar Pradesh.

The Fort is situated on Jhansi-Lalitpur four lane road. Raja Thakur Mardan Singh Bundela ruled here from this fort & he fought along with Rani Laxmi Bai against the British in 1857. The Fort contains three temples, dedicated to Angad, Hanuman & Narsimha . The Fort has massive structures and is situated on the bank of massive Mansarovar Lake. This lake is suitable for various water sports activities. In the premises there is Hazaria Mahadev Temple on the banks of Lake. Talbehat is also tehseel headquarter. tehseel talbehat area is divided into six Revenue Inspectors circles.

Demographics

 India census, Talbehat has a population of 14,176 divided into 12 wards. Male population is 7,452 and that of female is 6,724. Talbehat has an average literacy rate of 79.40%, higher than state average of 67.68 %, male literacy is 85.20%, and female literacy is 72.96%. In Talbehat, 12.81% of the population is under 6 years of age. Out of the total population, 4,492 are engaged in work or business activity with 3,678 are males and rest 814 are females.

Schedule Caste (SC) and Schedule Tribe (ST) constitutes 19.06 % and 0.23 % of the total population in Talbehat. Based on the census 88.22% of the total population are Hindus, 7.26% are Muslims, 4.32% are Jains and the rest is occupied by Christian, Sikh and Buddhist.

Transportation
 
The town is located next to a major highway 26 and main line of Delhi & Bombay train route. Talbehat has very few trains stopping at the railway station established in 1980's, the preferable way to reach is by train from Jhansi or Lalitpur.

Places to visit

The places to visit includes nearby Matatila Dam and famous religious temples such as Pawagir Ji Jain Temple, Deva Mata Temple and other tourist places include Talbehat Fort, Boat Club and Mansarovar Lake . 

Talbehat is surrounded by stony ridges descending towards the Betwa river valley. The area receives moderate rainfall.

Temples are in Talbehat, Hajaria Mahadev, Madan Mohan Sharkar, Hanuman Gari, Gauri Bhawani, Merahune mata and Dhuruv Kuti Maharaj.

References

Cities and town in Lalitpur district, India
Forts in Uttar Pradesh